Pagodula carinatus is a fossil species of sea snail, a marine gastropod mollusk in the family Muricidae, the murex snails or rock snails.

The names Trophon carinatus Jeffreys, 1883  and Trophon vaginatus auct. (not Cristofori & Jan 1832), established for fossils, have been used during much of the 19th and 20th century to designate the Recent species now validly known as Pagodula echinata (Kiener, 1840) of which they have become synonyms.

Description

Distribution

References

Fossil taxa described in 1832
Gastropods described in 1832
Pagodula